Lewin Blum (born 27 July 2001) is a Swiss professional footballer who plays as a right-back for the Swiss club Young Boys.

Professional career
A youth product of FC Roggwil, Blum moved to the youth academy of Young Boys in 2012 and worked his way up through their youth categories. He signed his first professional contract with Young Boys on 16 June 2021, and then went on loan with Yverdon-Sport for the 2021–22 season in the Swiss Challenge League. Halfway through the season, on 3 January 2022, Young Boys activated a clause to bring Blum back to their squad early. He made his professional debut with Young Boys in a 1–1 Swiss Super League tie with Lugano on 29 January 2022.

References

External links
 
 SFL Profile

2001 births
Living people
Sportspeople from Aargau
Swiss men's footballers
Switzerland youth international footballers
BSC Young Boys players
Yverdon-Sport FC players
Swiss Super League players
Swiss Challenge League players
Association football fullbacks